

Events
Composer Christoph Graupner loses his sight.
Publication of Giuseppe Tartini's treatise Trattato di musica secondo la vera scienza dell'armonia.
Giovanni Paisiello goes to the Conservatorio di S. Onofrio at Naples, where he studies under Francesco Durante.

Classical music
Joseph Anton Xaver Auffmann – Triplex concentus organicus, seu III. concerti organici à octo instrumentis (3 organ concertos), Op. 1 (Augsburg)
Michael Festing – Violin Sonatas (published posthumously)
François-Joseph Gossec – Symphony No. 1
John Jones – 8 Setts of Lessons for harpsichord (London)
Pietro Locatelli – La foresta incantata (ballet)
Pietro Domenico Paradisi – 12 Harpsichord Sonatas
Joan Baptista Pla and Josep Pla – 6 Trio Sonatas
Nicola Porpora
6 duetti latini per la Passione di Gesù Cristo
12 Violin Sonatas, Op. 12
John Stanley – Ten Voluntarys for organ or harpsichord, Op. 7 (London)

Opera
Vincenzo Legrenzio Ciampi – Didone
Nicola Conforto – Ezio
Baldassare Galuppi – Il filosofo di campagna
Christoph Willibald Gluck – Le Cinesi, Wq.18
Johann Adolph Hasse – Artemisia
Jean-Philippe Rameau 
Anacréon, RCT 30
La Naissance d'Osiris, RCT 48

Methods and theory writings 

Dom Philippe-Joseph Caffiaux – Histoire de la musique depuis l’Antiquité jusqu’en 1754
Michel Corrette – Prototipes contenant des leçons d’accompagnement
 Friedrich Wilhelm Marpurg – Historisch-Kritische Beyträge zur Aufnahme der Musik
 Johann Mattheson – Plus Ultra
 Jean-Philippe Rameau – Observations sur notre instinct pour la musique, et sur son principe
 Giuseppe Tartini – Trattato di musica

Births
March 15 – Silvestro Palma, opera composer (died 1834)
May 2 – Vicente Martín y Soler, composer of opera and ballet (died 1806)
May 12 – Franz Anton Hoffmeister, composer and music publisher (died 1812)
June 21 – Caroline Louise von Klencke, librettist and poet (died 1802)
July 15 – Jacob French, singing master and composer (died 1817)
July 18 – Joseph Siegmund Bachmann, composer and organist (died 1825)
August 28 – Peter Winter, opera composer (died 1825)
September – Elizabeth Ann Linley, singer (died 1792)
December 9 – Étienne Ozi, bassoonist and composer (died 1813)

December 20 – Joseph Schubert, violinist and composer (died 1837)
date unknown 
Hans Gram, organist and composer (died 1804) 
Michel Yost, composer and clarinetist (died 1786)

Deaths
May 16 – Giovanni Carlo Maria Clari, composer and Kapellmeister (born 1677)
June 22 – Nicolas Siret, organist, harpsichordist and composer (born 1663)
October 6 – Adam Falckenhagen, lutenist and composer (born 1697)
probable
Mlle Guédon de Presles, singer, composer and actress (date of birth unknown)
Seedo, German theatre composer working in Britain (born c.1700)

 
18th century in music
Music by year